Jean-Auguste Jullien, called Desboulmiers, 1731, Paris – 1771, Paris, was an 18th-century French man of letters, historian of theatre and playwright.

Works 
1761: Les Soirées du Palais-Royal, ou les Veillées d'une jolie femme, contenant quatre Lettres à une amie, avec la conversation des chaises du Palais-Royal
1761: Honny soit qui mal y pense, ou Histoires des filles célèbres du XVIIIe, Read online
1770: Rose, ou les Effets de la haine, de l'amour et de l'amitié. Reprinted under the title L'Éducation de l'amour.
1766–1767: Mémoires du marquis de Solanges, 2 vol., Tome 2 online
1767: Pensées philosophiques, morales, critiques, littéraires et politiques de M. Hume. 
1767: L'Esprit et la chose. Also attributed to Jean-Henri Marchand.
1768: De tout un peu, ou les Amusements de la campagne.
1769:  Histoire anecdotique et raisonnée du Théâtre-Italien, depuis son rétablissement en France, jusqu'à l'année 1769, contenant les analyses des principales pièces et un catalogue de toutes celles tant italiennes que françaises données sur ce théâtre, avec les anecdotes les plus curieuses et les notices les plus intéressantes de la vie et des talents des auteurs, 6 vol. Reprint: Geneva, Slatkine.
1769: Histoire du théâtre de l'Opéra-Comique, 2 vol. Tome 2 online
1769: Le Bon fils, ou les Mémoires du comte de Samarandes, 2 vol.
1771: Trapue, reine des Topinamboux, ou la Maîtresse femme Read online
Théâtre
1763: Le Bon Seigneur, opéra comique in one act and in prose, music by Robert Desbrosses, Paris, Hôtel de Bourgogne, 19 February
1767: Toinon et Toinette, comedy in 2 acts in prose, mingled with ariettes, music by François-Joseph Gossec, Comédie Italienne, 20 June Read online
1777: Jemonville, ou les Époux malheureux, drama in 3 acts and in verse, theatre of Valenciennes, 10 February
1855: À la nuit close, comédie en vaudeville in 2 acts, with Marquet, Paris, Théâtre des Délassements-Comiques, 22 September

Sources 
 Nicolas-Toussaint Des Essarts, Les Siècles littéraires de la France, ou Nouveau dictionnaire, historique, critique, et bibliographique, de tous les écrivains français, morts et vivants, jusqu'à la fin du XVIIIe, Paris, chez l'auteur, vol. II, 1800, (p. 301–301)
 Pierre Larousse, Grand Dictionnaire biographique du XIXe, vol. VI, 1870, (p. 529)

External links 
 François-Xavier Feller, François Marie Pérennès, Jean Baptiste Pérennès: Biographie universelle, ou Dictionnaire historique des hommes qui se sont fait un nom par leur génie, leurs talents, leurs vertus, leurs erreurs ou leurs crimes, Band 4, Gauthier 1834, p. 279
 François-Joseph Fétis: Biographie universelle des musiciens et bibliographie générale de la musique, Band 3, Firmin Didot, 1866, p. 2
 His plays on CÉSAR

18th-century French writers
18th-century French male writers
18th-century French dramatists and playwrights
Literary historians
Writers from Paris
1731 births
1771 deaths